Formac is a European-based manufacturer of various PC devices. Formac is most widely known for its TFT Display range, desktop and portable data storage products, or historically for its advanced Graphics cards and video conversion products.

Displays 
Their high specification Gallery Range of TFT displays has dominated the European design market, and has continued to be popular since its launch in 2004.

Portable storage 
In 2006 Formac launched the Disk Mini range of portable data storage for Windows and Mac computers. The first models were equipped with FireWire (IEEE1394) and USB 2.0 ports to cater for fast data transfer speeds. The Disk Mini range has received numerous awards and award nominations both from IT industry press and from public. In 2007 a USB 2.0 only version was released sending the Disk Mini in to the mainstream data storage arena.

References

Semiconductor companies of Germany
Fabless semiconductor companies